Bouzic is a commune in the Dordogne department in southwestern France.

Geography
The river Céou forms part of the commune's northeastern border, then flows west through its northern part.

Population

See also
Communes of the Dordogne département

References

Communes of Dordogne